Derek William Bentley (30 June 1933 – 28 January 1953) was a British man who was hanged for the murder of a policeman during a burglary attempt. Christopher Craig, then aged 16, a friend and accomplice of Bentley, was accused of the murder. Bentley was convicted as a party to the crime under the English law principle of "joint enterprise", as the burglary had been committed in mutual understanding and bringing deadly weapons. The outcome of the trial, and Home Secretary David Maxwell Fyfe's failure to grant clemency to Bentley, were highly controversial.

The jury at the trial found Bentley guilty based on the prosecution's interpretation of the ambiguous phrase "Let him have it" (Bentley's alleged exhortation to Craig) after the judge, Lord Chief Justice Goddard, had described Bentley as "mentally aiding" the murder. Goddard sentenced Bentley to be hanged, despite a recommendation for mercy by the jury: under the Judgment of Death Act 1823, no other sentence was possible (subsequently the Homicide Act 1957, which introduced stronger "diminished responsibility" safeguards, was all but certainly influenced by the Bentley trial).

The Bentley case became a cause célèbre and led to a 45-year-long campaign to win Bentley a posthumous pardon, which was granted in 1993, and then a further campaign for the quashing of his murder conviction, which occurred in 1998. Bentley's case is thus considered a case of miscarriage of justice alongside that of Timothy Evans, and pivotal in the successful campaign to abolish capital punishment in the United Kingdom.

Early life
Derek Bentley entered Norbury Manor Secondary Modern School in 1944, after failing the eleven-plus examination. Just before leaving, in March 1948, he and another boy were arrested for theft. Six months later, Bentley was sentenced to serve three years at Kingswood Approved School near Bristol. Christopher Craig also attended the same Secondary Modern school.

Health and mental development
Bentley had a series of health problems. His parents reported that in a childhood accident he had broken his nose and since then he had three seizure fits, including one in which they said he nearly died of choking. The family also said they were bombed out three times during the Second World War, and in one of these incidents the house in which he lived collapsed around him, but a court did not find any indication that he was physically injured in the incident. However, Bentley was later seen to have epilepsy.

Bentley was sent to Kingswood Training School, Bristol, on 27 October 1948. There he was administered diagnostic tests which eventually determined, when he was  years old, that his mental age was estimated at ten years, four months, while he had scored 66 on an IQ test. Kingswood staff reported Bentley to be "lazy, indifferent, voluble and of the 'wise guy' type", whilst a court described him as "indifferent, smug, self-satisfied and ready to tell tales". After his arrest in November 1952, further IQ tests were administered to him at Brixton Prison. He was described there as "borderline feeble-minded", with a verbal score of 71, a performance IQ of 87 and a full scale IQ of 77. Bentley was discovered to still be "quite illiterate" at the time of his arrest in November 1952. The prison medical officer said he "cannot even recognise or write down all the letters of the alphabet". 

Bentley was examined twice by EEG: a reading on 16 November 1949 indicated he was an epileptic and a reading on 9 February 1950 was "abnormal". Both were taken at the Burden Neurological Institute in Bristol.

Release from Kingswood
Bentley was released from Kingswood school on 28 July 1950, a year early, though he remained under the care of Kingswood until 29 September 1954, by which time he was dead. He was a recluse for the rest of 1950, rarely venturing out of the house, breaking his isolation in January 1951. In March 1951, he was employed by a furniture removal firm but was forced to leave the job after injuring his back in March 1952. In May 1952, Bentley was taken on by the Croydon Corporation as a dustbin man; one month later, in June 1952 he was demoted to street sweeping for unsatisfactory performance. One month after that, he was sacked by the corporation. He was still unemployed at the time of his arrest in November 1952.

Crime
On the night of Sunday 2 November 1952, Bentley and a 16-year-old companion, Christopher Craig, attempted to burgle the warehouse of the Barlow & Parker confectionery company at 27–29 Tamworth Road, Croydon. Craig armed himself with a Colt New Service .455 Webley calibre revolver, the barrel of which he had shortened so that it could be carried easily in his pocket. He also carried a number of undersized rounds for the revolver, some of which he had modified by hand to fit the gun. Bentley carried a knuckle-duster, which he had been given by Craig, who had been fined the previous year for possessing a firearm without a certificate.

At around 9:15pm, neighbours called police after spotting Craig and Bentley climbing over the gate and up a drainpipe to the roof of the warehouse.

When police arrived, Craig and Bentley hid behind the lift-housing. Craig taunted the police. One of the officers, Detective Sergeant Frederick Fairfax, climbed the drainpipe to the roof and grabbed hold of Bentley, but Bentley broke free. What happened then is uncertain: police witnesses later claimed that Fairfax ordered Craig to "Hand over the gun, lad" and Bentley shouted, "Let him have it, Chris". Craig fired, striking Fairfax in the shoulder. Fairfax was nonetheless again able to restrain Bentley, who told Fairfax that Craig had further ammunition for the gun. Bentley had not used either of the weapons in his pockets.

A group of uniformed police officers arrived and were sent onto the roof. The first to reach the roof was Police Constable Sidney Miles, who was immediately killed by a shot to the head. After exhausting his ammunition and being cornered, Craig jumped 30 feet (10 metres) from the roof onto a greenhouse, fracturing his spine and left wrist, and had to remain in hospital.

Trial
Both Craig and Bentley were charged with the murder of PC Miles on the following day, 3 November 1952. They were tried by jury before the Lord Chief Justice, Lord Goddard, at the Old Bailey in London between 9 December and 11 December 1952. Christmas Humphreys, Senior Treasury Counsel, led for the prosecution.

At the time of the burglary attempt and Miles's death, murder was a capital offence in England and Wales. Minors under 18 were not sentenced to death: consequently, of the two defendants, despite Craig having fired the fatal shot, only Bentley faced the death penalty if convicted. The doctrine of felony murder or "constructive malice" meant that a charge of manslaughter was not an option, as the "malicious intent" of the armed robbery was transferred to the shooting. Bentley's best defence was that he was effectively under arrest when Miles was killed. There were three principal points of contention at trial:

Firstly, the defence claimed there was ambiguity in the evidence as to how many shots were fired and by whom. A later forensic ballistics expert cast doubt on whether Craig could have hit Miles if he had shot at him deliberately: The fatal bullet was not found. Craig had used bullets of different undersized calibres, and the sawn-off barrel made it inaccurate to a degree of six feet at the range from which he fired.

Secondly, there was controversy over the existence and meaning of Bentley's alleged instruction to Craig, "let him have it, Chris". Craig and Bentley denied that Bentley had said the words while the police officers testified that he had said them. Further, Bentley's counsel argued that even if he had said the words, it could not be proven that Bentley had intended the words to mean the informal meaning of "shoot him, Chris" instead of the literal meaning of "give him the gun, Chris".

Thirdly, there was disagreement over whether Bentley was fit to stand trial in light of his mental capacity. The Principal Medical Officer responsible was Dr Matheson and he referred Bentley to Dr. Hill, a psychiatrist at the Maudsley Hospital. Hill's report stated that Bentley was illiterate and of low intelligence, almost borderline retarded. However, Matheson was of the opinion that whilst agreeing that Bentley was of low intelligence, he did not have epilepsy at the time of the alleged offence and he was not a "feeble-minded person" under the Mental Deficiency Acts. Matheson said that he was sane and fit to plead and stand trial. English law at the time did not recognise the concept of diminished responsibility due to retarded development, though it existed in Scottish law (it was introduced to England by the Homicide Act 1957). Criminal insanity – where the accused is unable to distinguish right from wrong – was then the only medical defence to murder. Bentley, while he had a severe debilitation, was not insane.

The jury took 75 minutes to decide that both Craig and Bentley were guilty of Miles's murder, with a plea for mercy for Bentley. Bentley was sentenced to death whilst Craig was ordered to be detained at Her Majesty's Pleasure. He was eventually released in May 1963 after serving 10 years' imprisonment, married two years later and subsequently became a plumber.

Bentley was originally scheduled to be hanged on 30 December 1952 but this was postponed to allow for an appeal. Bentley's lawyers filed appeals highlighting the ambiguities of the ballistic evidence, Bentley's mental age and the fact that he did not fire the fatal shot. Bentley's appeal was heard on 13 January 1953 and was unsuccessful.

Decision not to reprieve Bentley
When his appeal was turned down, Bentley's life was placed in the hands of the Home Secretary, David Maxwell Fyfe, who had to decide whether to recommend that the Queen exercise the royal prerogative of mercy to commute his death sentence to life imprisonment. Lord Goddard forwarded the jury's recommendation of mercy, but added that he himself "could find no mitigating circumstances". His later statements to author David Yallop, which convinced Yallop that Goddard had wanted a reprieve, appear to have been incorrectly quoted.

Maxwell Fyfe's autobiography, published in 1964, refers to the factors which he took into consideration: "the evidence of the trial, medical reports, family or other private circumstances ... and police reports, ... the available precedents, and ... public opinion". He went on to say that Bentley's case also involved the issue of the police force, since it was a police officer who was killed. Maxwell Fyfe then stresses that a reprieve would mean the Home Secretary is "intervening in the due process of the law". Maxwell Fyfe, in the words of the letter sent out, failed to discover any sufficient ground to justify him in advising Her Majesty to interfere in the due course of the law.

There was much political pressure to commute Bentley's sentence, including a memorandum signed by over 200 members of Parliament. Despite several attempts, Parliament was given no opportunity to debate the issue until the sentence had been carried out. The Home Office also refused Dr Hill permission to make his report public.

At 9am on 28 January 1953, Bentley was hanged at Wandsworth Prison, London, by Albert Pierrepoint, with Harry Allen assisting. There were protests outside the prison and two people were arrested and fined for damage to property.

In March 1966, Bentley's remains were removed from Wandsworth and re-interred in Croydon Cemetery.

To Encourage the Others
In his 1971 book To Encourage the Others (the title is an acknowledged allusion to Voltaire's Candide), David Yallop documented Bentley's psychiatric problems, as well as what he believed were inconsistencies in the police and forensic evidence and the conduct of the trial. Despite Craig's gun being the only one on the roof at the moment that Miles was shot, he proposed the theory that Miles was actually killed by a bullet from a gun other than Craig's sawn-off .455 revolver. Yallop drew this conclusion from an interview in March 1971 with David Haler, the pathologist who carried out the autopsy on Miles, who Yallop reports estimated the head wound was inflicted by a bullet of between .32 and .38 calibre fired from between six and nine feet away. Craig had been firing from a distance of just under 40 feet and had used a variety of undersized .41, and .45 calibre rounds in his revolver; Yallop asserted it would have been impossible for him to use a bullet of .38 or smaller calibre. Haler did not offer in his trial evidence any estimate of the size of the bullet that had killed Miles. In July 1970, during an interview with Yallop, Craig accepted that the bullet that killed Miles came from his gun, but maintained that all of his shots were fired over the rear garden of a house adjacent to the warehouse, approximately 20 degrees to the right of Miles's location from where Craig had been firing.

The standard Metropolitan Police pistol at the time was the .32-calibre Webley automatic, a number of which were issued on the night. In his book The Scientific Investigation of Crime, the prosecution's ballistics expert Lewis Nickolls stated that he recovered four bullets from the roof, two of .45, one of .41 and one of .32 calibre. The last was not entered as an exhibit in the trial, nor mentioned in Nickolls' evidence to the court.

When Yallop telephoned Haler the day after the initial interview, he reportedly confirmed his estimate of the bullet size. Shortly before the publication of Yallop's book, Haler was provided with a transcript of the interview, and Yallop says Haler again confirmed as accurate. After the subsequent broadcast of the BBC Play for Today adaptation of To Encourage the Others, directed by Alan Clarke and starring Charles Bolton, Haler sought to deny that he had given any specific estimate of the size of the bullet that killed Miles beyond being "of large calibre". The .32 ACP bullet is not considered to be of large calibre.

Contrary to Yallop's claims, none of the police officers present was armed at the moment when PC Miles was shot. Det Con (later Det Sgt) Fairfax, after Miles was shot and after taking Bentley to street level and putting him into a police car, returned to the roof armed with a Webley & Scott .32 and fired two shots at Craig, both of which missed. Since a .32 round could not be loaded into Craig's revolver and Craig was the only armed person in the vicinity at the time of the murder, the spent .32 round could only be one of Fairfax's, fired some time subsequently. As the Court of Appeal found, 'Once the appellant [Bentley] had been taken down, D.C. Fairfax returned with a firearm, with which he had been issued, and went back up to the roof. He fired twice at Craig but missed, Craig having fired at him. Craig's revolver was by now empty and he jumped or dived off the roof, suffering a fractured spine, breast bone and left forearm. Notwithstanding this, he was able to tell the first police officer who reached him that he wished he had "killed the fucking lot". He later made a number of statements to police officers sitting with him in hospital, displaying a hatred of the police and a total lack of remorse at what he had done.'

Posthumous pardon
Following the execution there was a public sense of unease about the decision, resulting in a long campaign to secure a posthumous pardon. The campaign was initially led by Bentley's parents until their deaths in the 1970s, after which the drive to clear Bentley's name was led by his sister Iris. In March 1966 his remains were removed from Wandsworth Prison and reburied in a family grave. In August 1970, Lord Goddard told Yallop that he thought Bentley was going to be reprieved, said he should have been, and attacked David Maxwell Fyfe for allowing the execution to go ahead.

On 29 July 1993, Bentley was granted a royal pardon in respect of the sentence of death passed upon him and carried out. However, in English law this did not quash his conviction for murder.

Eventually, on 30 July 1998, the Court of Appeal quashed Bentley's conviction for murder. However, Bentley's sister Iris had died of cancer the year before. Her daughter, Maria Bentley-Dingwall, who was born 10 years after Derek Bentley's execution, continued the campaign after her mother's death.

Christopher Craig, by then aged 62 (born May 1936), issued a statement welcoming the pardon for Bentley, stating that "his innocence has now been proved". He also apologised to the families of both PC Miles and Bentley for his actions, as well as his own family for the press intrusion they had suffered over the years.

Though Bentley had never been accused of attacking any of the police officers, who were shot at by Craig, for him to be convicted of murder as an accessory in a joint enterprise it was necessary for the prosecution to prove that he knew that Craig had a deadly weapon when they began the break-in. The Lord Chief Justice, Lord Bingham of Cornhill, ruled that Lord Goddard had not made it clear to the jury that the prosecution was required to have proved Bentley had known that Craig was armed. He further ruled that Lord Goddard had failed to raise the question of Bentley's withdrawal from their joint enterprise. This would require the prosecution to prove the absence of any attempt by Bentley to signal to Craig that he wanted Craig to surrender his weapons to the police. Lord Bingham ruled that Bentley's trial had been unfair because the judge had misdirected the jury and, in his summing-up, had put unfair pressure on the jury to convict. It is possible that Lord Goddard may have been under pressure while summing up since much of the evidence was not directly relevant to Bentley's defence. Lord Bingham did not rule that Bentley was innocent, merely that there had been fundamental defects in the trial process.

Another factor in the posthumous defence was that a "confession" recorded by Bentley, which was claimed by the prosecution to be a "verbatim record of dictated monologue", was shown by forensic linguistics methods to have been largely edited by policemen. Linguist Malcolm Coulthard showed that certain patterns, such as the frequency of the word "then" and the grammatical use of "then" after the grammatical subject ("I then" rather than "then I"), were not consistent with Bentley's use of language (his idiolect), as evidenced in court testimony. These patterns fit better the recorded testimony of the policemen involved. This is one of the earliest uses of forensic linguistics on record.

In a case with similarities to the Bentley case, a House of Lords judgment of 17 July 1997 cleared Philip English of murdering Sergeant Bill Forth in March 1993, the reasons being given by Lord Hutton. English had been handcuffed before his companion Paul Weddle killed Sgt Forth with a concealed knife. The existing joint enterprise law allowed the conviction of English for murder because they had both been attacking Sgt Forth with wooden staves, making English an accessory to any murder committed by Weddle as part of that assault. Lord Hutton made the 'fine distinction' that a concealed knife was a far more deadly weapon than a wooden stave, so that proof of English's knowledge of it was necessary for conviction. The appeal may have influenced the allowing of a posthumous referral of the Bentley case.

Lord Mustill had asked for new laws on homicide when setting out his reasons at the time of Lord Hutton's ruling on English's appeal. However, Lord Bingham's ruling blamed Lord Goddard for a miscarriage of justice without making further alteration to the law on joint enterprise. The English judgement, delivered just over two months after the Labour government took office, remained the most recent precedent in joint enterprise law, though the Bentley verdict attracted far more media attention.

In popular culture

A play Example, starring Harry Miller as Bentley, was devised by the Coventry Belgrade TIE Team for fifth and sixth form students and toured from 1975. The play, with an introduction by Miller, was included in a 1980 book Theatre in Education – Four Secondary School Programmes.

The 1990 book Let Him Have It, Chris written by M J Trow explores the inconsistencies in the police version of events.

The 1991 feature film Let Him Have It, starring Christopher Eccleston as Bentley and Paul Reynolds as Craig, relates the story, as do the songs "Derek Bentley" by Karl Dallas (in which the lyrics imply that Bentley was guilty but sympathise with him), "Let Him Dangle" by Elvis Costello, "Let Him Have It" by The Bureau, and "Bentley and Craig" by Ralph McTell, whose mother was a friend of the Bentley family, also covered by June Tabor (on Aleyn, TSCD490, 1997).

In the 2013 novel The Late Scholar by Jill Paton Walsh, the character Peter Wimsey notes that the Bentley case has reduced the support for capital punishment.

See also
Ruth Ellis
R v Betts and Ridley
List of British police officers killed in the line of duty

References

Cited works and further reading

External links
Derek Bentley Page by Simon Reap

Judgement of England and Wales Court of Appeal (Criminal Division) in R v. Derek William Bentley (Deceased) [1998] EWCA Crim 2516, 1998
Opinions of the Lords of Appeal for Judgment in the Cause R v English

1933 births
1953 deaths
1952 murders in the United Kingdom
1950s murders in London
British people convicted of murdering police officers
Murder in Surrey
Executed people from London
History of the London Borough of Croydon
Murder trials
Overturned convictions in the United Kingdom
20th-century executions by England and Wales
People executed for murdering police officers
People executed by the United Kingdom by hanging
People from Croydon
Recipients of British royal pardons
Trials in London
Wrongful executions
People executed for murder
English criminal case law